Operación Escorpión (Operation Scorpion), was a military operation conducted by the Mexican Secretariat of National Defense, from August 28 to October 31, 2011, in the states of Coahuila, Nuevo León, Tamaulipas and San Luis Potosí. The prime objective was to weaken the Zetas and Gulf cartels. During the operation, 75 attacks from the criminals were prevented and repelled.

Seized assets and achievements
 130 kidnapped persons freed
 1,093 criminals arrested
 50032.64 kg of marijuana 
 18.765 doses of marijuana
 26.256 kg cocaine
 12.417 doses of cocaine
 4,286 kg of crack cocaine
 40.553 doses of crack
 $11'720,642 Mexican pesos
 $910,000 United States dollars
 735.843 liters of fuel
 34 Tons of steel
 3,099 firearms
 14,272 magazines
 381.706 cartridges of various calibres
 345 grenades
 28 grenade launchers
 7 antitank weapons
 4 rockets
 40 motorcycles
 49 different types of trailers
 9 boats
 1,355 vehicles (62 of them armored)
 Tactical equipment
 Uniforms
 Body armor
 Tactical load carrying suspenders
 Communications equipment
 53 pirate taxis
 More than 3,000 auto parts (reported as stolen)
 27 illegal casinos were closed
 22 "dark trades" were closed (legal businesses working as fronts for illegal drug trade and brothels)
 492 corrupt policemen arrested
 175 suspicious policemen detained
 112 attackers killed
 75 attacks repelled

Operation casualties  
 2 soldiers killed in action
 18 soldiers injured in the line of duty

References

Battles of the Mexican drug war
Military operations involving Mexico
Operations against organized crime in Mexico
Gulf Cartel
Los Zetas